The 1987 Star World Championships were held in Chicago, United States in 1987.

Results

References

Star World Championships
1987 in sailing
Star World Championships in the United States